Sacred is the second album by Irish grunge band Paradox, released on May 11, 2004.

Track listing

Credits
Pete Mac – Guitar, vocals and Bass
Mike Mac – Drums / vocals
Produced by Pete Mac and Mike Mac

External links 
 discogs.com

2004 albums
Paradox (Irish band) albums